The Hon Arthur Duff (1743 – 2 June 1805) was a Scottish Member of Parliament who served during the latter part of the 1770s.

A younger son of William Duff, 1st Earl Fife, he was educated at St. Andrews University, Glasgow University and Leyden University.

He was member of Parliament for Elginshire from 1774 to 1779. He was appointed Steward of the Manor of East Hendred on 29 April 1779 to allow Lord William Gordon to be brought into Parliament. He was then appointed Comptroller of the Excise in Scotland.

He never married, and latterly lived at the estate at Orton, Moray he had inherited from his father.

Legacy 
The first Arthur's Bridge, opened in 1852, was named after Duff.

Sources
 The History of Parliament: the House of Commons 1754–1790, ed. Lewis Bernstein Namier, John Brooke, 1964 

1743 births
1805 deaths
Alumni of the University of St Andrews
Alumni of the University of Glasgow
Members of the Parliament of Great Britain for Scottish constituencies
British MPs 1774–1780
Younger sons of earls